XHEZUM-FM is a radio station on 105.1 FM in Chilpancingo, Guerrero, Mexico.

History
XHEZUM began as XEZUM-AM 1050, a daytimer owned by Francisco Alejandro Wong and first licensed in 1993. It was sold to OEM in 2010 and received approval to move to FM the next year.

References

Radio stations in Guerrero
Radio stations established in 1993